Cora arachnodavidea is a species of basidiolichen in the family Hygrophoraceae. It was formally described as a new species in 2016 by Bibiana Moncada, Manuela Dal Forno, and Robert Lücking. The specific epithet alludes to the arachnoid surface of the thallus, and also refers to mycologist David Leslie Hawksworth. The lichen is only known to occur in the páramo of Guasca in Colombia, where it grows on the ground in sheltered places between plants and bryophytes.

References

arachnodavidea
Lichen species
Lichens described in 2016
Lichens of Colombia
Taxa named by Robert Lücking
Basidiolichens